Group C of the 1999 FIFA Women's World Cup took place from June 19 to 26, 1999. The group consisted of Canada, Japan, Norway and Russia.

Standings

Matches
All times listed are local time.

Japan vs Canada

Norway vs Russia

Norway vs Canada

Japan vs Russia

Canada vs Russia

Norway vs Japan

References

External links
FIFA Women's World Cup USA 1999 at FIFA.com

1999 FIFA Women's World Cup
Canada at the 1999 FIFA Women's World Cup
Japan at the 1999 FIFA Women's World Cup
Norway at the 1999 FIFA Women's World Cup
Russia at the 1999 FIFA Women's World Cup